Willie Strath (born c. 1842) was a Scottish professional golfer. Strath placed sixth in the 1864 Open Championship.

Early life
Strath was born in Scotland circa 1842.

Golf career

1864 Open Championship
The 1864 Open Championship was the fifth Open Championship and was contested on 16 September at Prestwick Golf Club. Tom Morris, Sr. won the championship for the third time, by two shots from Andrew Strath. There were sixteen competitors.

Death
It is believed that Willie Strath died young from tuberculosis. His date of death is unknown.

References

Scottish male golfers